Asymmetric may refer to:
Asymmetry in geometry, chemistry, and physics

Computing
Asymmetric cryptography, in public-key cryptography
Asymmetric digital subscriber line, Internet connectivity
Asymmetric multiprocessing, in computer architecture

Other
Asymmetric relation, in set theory
Asymmetric synthesis, in organic synthesis 
Asymmetric warfare, in modern war
Asymmetric Publications, a video game company
Asymmetry (Mallory Knox album), 2014
Asymmetry (Karnivool album)
Asymmetry (population ethics)
Asymmetry (novel), a 2018 novel by Lisa Halliday

See also